Všeruby is a market town in the Domažlice District in the Plzeň Region of the Czech Republic. It has about 800 inhabitants.

Administrative parts
Villages of Brůdek, Chalupy, Hájek, Hyršov, Kosteliště, Maxov, Pláně, Pomezí and Studánky are administrative parts of Všeruby.

References

Populated places in Domažlice District
Market towns in the Czech Republic